Albin Enrique Dubois Ramírez was Guatemala's Minister of National Defence.

References

Living people
Year of birth missing (living people)
Defense Ministers of Guatemala